Marble Falls may refer to:

 Marble Falls, Arkansas
 Marble Falls, Texas